Lensky is a rural locality (a settlement) in Lukovsky Selsoviet, Pankrushikhinsky District, Altai Krai, Russia. The population was 217 in 2013. There are two streets.

Geography 
Lensky is located 27 km northwest of Pankrushikha (the district's administrative centre) by road. Petrovsky is the nearest rural locality.

References 

Rural localities in Pankrushikhinsky District